France was present at the Eurovision Song Contest 1986, held in Bergen, Norway.

Before Eurovision

L'Eurovision 1986 
The French national final to select their entry, L'Eurovision 1986, was held on 22 March 1986 at the SFP Studios in Paris, and was hosted by Patrice Laffont, a famous game show host well known for hosting Des chiffres et des lettres.

Fourteen songs made it to the national final, which was broadcast by Antenne 2 across France and to the overseas departments. The winner was decided by a sample of television viewers who were telephoned at random and asked their opinion of each song. The winning entry was "Européennes", performed by the quartet Cocktail and composed by Georges Costa and Michel Costa.

At Eurovision
Before performing at Bergen, Cocktail changed their name to Cocktail Chic. They were the third act on the night of the Contest, following Yugoslavia and preceding Norway. At the close of the voting the song had received 13 points, placing 17th in a field of 20 competing countries. At the time it was the worst placing for France in the Contest's history, and would remain so until 1996.

Voting

References

External links
French National Final 1986

1986
Countries in the Eurovision Song Contest 1986
Eurovision
Eurovision